Christian Wallumrød (born 26 April 1971 in Kongsberg, Norway) is a Norwegian jazz musician (piano, organ and electronic keyboards) and composer, and is considered one of the most prominent musicians of the younger Norwegian generation, known from releases with his own Christian Wallumrød Ensemble on the German label ECM Records, while regularly touring and appearing in festivals in Norway, elsewhere in Scandinavia and Europe, and in the US. He is the brother of jazz vocalist Susanna Wallumrød and the drummer Fredrik Wallumrød, and cousin to the pianist David Wallumrød.

Career
Wallumrød was educated on the Jazz Program at Trondheim Musikkonservatorium, where he cooperated with the bands Airamero, Nutrio together with Eldbjørg Raknes and Arve Henriksen, as well as in a trio with drummer Espen Rud and bassist Johannes Eick, among others. After moving to Oslo he has played in a quartet with Petter Wettre, composed the commissioned work Eight Thirty for Kongsberg Jazz Festival with Ståle Storløkken (1994), and operated the trio Close Erase with Ingebrigt Håker Flaten (bass) and Per Oddvar Johansen (drums), with four releases. He has also contributed on recordings within a wide range of musical expressions, like Odd Børretzen & Lars Martin Myhre (Noen ganger er det all right, 1995), Jon Eberson's Jazzpunkensemblet (Thirteen Rounds, 1997), Jacob Young (Glow, 1999), with Arve Henriksen, Jan Bang and Erik Honoré (Birth wish, 2000), and last but not the leased Audun Kleive's Generator X (Generator X, 2000)

Wallumrød has continued the cooperation with Henriksen, in a trio with Hans-Kristian Kjos Sørensen with the albums No birch (1997) and Birth wish (2001), and in his own Christian Wallumrød Ensemble with Per Oddvar Johansen (trommer) releasing Sofienberg variations (2003) and A year from easter (2005), all on the German label ECM.

In the autumn 2006 he toured with his own Christian Wallumrød Sextet, consisting of the personnel from his Christian Wallumrød Ensamble reinforced with string trio Tanja Orning (cello), Gjermund Larsen (violin) and Giovanna Pessi (harp). Other prominent partnership include Ketil Gutvik, Sidsel Endresen and Jan Bang, resulting in a series of album releases. On his latest albums Fabula Suite Lugano (2009) and Outstairs (2013) with Christian Wallumrød Ensamble, he leads a virtuoso ensemble at low speed. It is a beautiful but unsettling experience. We get a mixture of catchy songs with recognizable melodies and simple harmonies, combined with idea-based compositions where the musicians' improvising abilities are expressed.

John Kellman of the All About Jazz magazine recognized Christian Wallumrød Ensemble's appearance at TD Ottawa Jazz Festival June 2013, as no. 8 of his "Best Live Shows of 2013".

Honors 
2001: Kongsberg Jazz Award

Discography

Solo albums 
2015: Pianokammer (Hubro Music)

As Band Leader 
With Christian Wallumrød Trio
1998: No Birch (ECM)

With Christian Wallumrød Ensemble
2001: Sofienberg Variations (ECM)
2004: A Year From Easter (ECM)
2007: The Zoo Is Far (ECM)
2009: Fabula Suite Lugano (ECM)
2013: Outstairs (ECM)
2016: Kurzsam And Fulger (Hubro Music)

Collaborations 
With Close Erase
1996: Close Erase (NorCD)
1999: No. 2 (NorCD)
2001: Dance This (Blå Production)
2006: Sport Rocks (Jazzaway)

With Audun Kleives Generator X
2000: Generator X (Jazzland)
2004: Ohmagoddabl (Jazzland)
2012: Attack  (POLselection)

With Karl Seglem
2004: Nye Nord (NorCD)
2004: New North (NorCD)

With others
1994: Airamero (Odin Records), with Airamero
1995: Noen Ganger Er Det All Right (Tylden), with Odd Børretzen and Lars Martin Myhre
1997: Thirteen Rounds (Curling Legs), with Jon Eberson's Jazzpunkensemble
1997: Fra Himmelen (NorCD), with Elin Rosseland and Johannes Eick
2000: Birth Wish (Pan M Records), with Arve Henriksen, Jan Bang and Erik Honoré
2001: Glow (Curling Legs), with Jacob Young
2002: Objects Of Desire (Albedo), Oslo Sinfonietta conducted by Christian Eggen and music composed by Eivind Buene, featuring Christian Wallumrød and Torben Snekkestad
2004: Merriwinkle (Jazzland), with Sidsel Endresen and Helge Sten
2006: Dans Les Arbres (ECM), with Xavier Charles, Ivar Grydeland and Ingar Zach

References

External links

Biografi from Norsk Musikkinformasjon (in Norwegian)

20th-century Norwegian pianists
21st-century Norwegian pianists
Norwegian jazz pianists
Norwegian jazz composers
ECM Records artists
Hubro Music artists
Norwegian University of Science and Technology alumni
Musicians from Kongsberg
1971 births
Living people
Trondheim Jazz Orchestra members
Close Erase members
Jazzpunkensemblet members
TINGeLING members